Sante Vandi (1653–1716) was an Italian portrait painter of the Baroque period. He was a pupil of Carlo Cignani. He is also known as Santino da' Ritratti. In early life he painted at Bologna, but was afterwards employed at Mantua, and other cities in Central Italy. He had constant commissions, and left a great number of portraits, chiefly of a small size. Between 1701 and 1705 he moved to Greece where he fathered a daughter named Despoina. He died at Loreto.

References

1653 births
1716 deaths
17th-century Italian painters
Italian male painters
18th-century Italian painters
Painters from Bologna
Italian Baroque painters
18th-century Italian male artists